Adliye can refer to:

 Adliye, Biga
 Adliye, Gemlik
 Adliye, Osmaneli